Seth Govind Das (16 October 1896 – 18 June 1974) was an Indian independence activist and parliamentarian. He belonged to the Maheshwari merchant family of Raja Gokuldas of Jabalpur. The family began as the banking firm of Sevaram Khushalchand, one of the "great firms" as termed by T.A. Timberg.

Although born in a family with a history of loyalty to the British government, he was attracted to the movement to seek India's freedom from the British rule. He joined the Non Co-operation Movement led by Mahatma Gandhi in 1920 and was jailed five times for a total of eight years.  He became a member of the All India Congress Committee since 1920 and served in the Congress Working Committee of the Tripuri Session of the Congress in 1939. He was the  President of the Mahakoshal P.C.C. during 1928-34 and 1946-1957, and the Madhya Pradesh Congress Committee in 1957. 

Das was also a Hindi author and supported Hindi as the national language of India. He was jailed in Damoh for eight months by British, where he wrote four plays 'Prakash' (social), 'Kartavya' (mythological), 'Navras' (philosophical) and a 'Spardha'(one act play). He wrote more than a hundred plays, a novel "Indu-mati", five travel books, a three volume autobiography,  four biographies, mostly in Hindi.

He represented Jabalpur in the Indian Parliament from the first to the fifth Lok Sabha, continuously, from  1957 to 1974 when he died. He was appointed Speaker protem (prior to the formal election of a speaker) by the President for the Second, Third, Fourth and Fifth Lok Sabha and administered the oath of the office to all the rest of the Lok Sabha members. 

The Government of India awarded him the civilian honour of the Padma Bhushan in 1961.

See also
 Marwari people
 Hitkarini Sabha
 Ma chudao

References

External links
 Seth Govind Das
  Colonial Administration and Social Developments in Middle India: The Central Provinces, 1986–1921. PhD 1980 dissertation by Philip McEldowney

1896 births
1974 deaths
People from Jabalpur
Writers from Madhya Pradesh
Hindi-language writers
Members of the Constituent Assembly of India
India MPs 1957–1962
Recipients of the Padma Bhushan in literature & education
Indian independence activists from Madhya Pradesh
Prisoners and detainees of British India
Lok Sabha members from Madhya Pradesh
India MPs 1952–1957
India MPs 1962–1967
India MPs 1967–1970
India MPs 1971–1977
Members of the Central Legislative Assembly of India
Members of the Imperial Legislative Council of India
Pro tem Speakers of the Lok Sabha
Indian National Congress politicians
Gandhians
Indian National Congress politicians from Madhya Pradesh